Cory Laylin (born January 24, 1970) is an American former professional ice hockey and roller hockey defenseman.

Career
Laylin was drafted 214th overall by the Pittsburgh Penguins in the 1988 NHL Entry Draft from St. Cloud Apollo High School. He then committed to the University of Minnesota and played for the Minnesota Golden Gophers men's ice hockey team for four seasons before turning professional in 1992.

Laylin played the majority of his professional career in Europe. He played in the Austrian Hockey League for EK Zell am See and EC VSV, the Serie A for HC Gherdëina and Asiago Hockey, the Deutsche Eishockey Liga for the Iserlohn Roosters and Frankfurt Lions and the Metal Ligaen for the Frederikshavn White Hawks.

Laylin also played in Roller Hockey International, playing for the Minnesota Arctic Blast in 1994 and 1996, the San Jose Rhinos in 1997 and the Minnesota Blue Ox in 1999.

Career statistics

References

External links

1970 births
Living people
American men's ice hockey defensemen
Asiago Hockey 1935 players
SC Bietigheim-Bissingen players
HKMK Bled players
Bloomington PrairieThunder players
SHC Fassa players
Flint Bulldogs players
Frankfurt Lions players
Frederikshavn White Hawks players
EHC Freiburg players
HC Gardena players
Ice hockey players from Minnesota
Iserlohn Roosters players
EV Landsberg players
Minnesota Arctic Blast players
Minnesota Blue Ox players
Minnesota Golden Gophers men's ice hockey players
HDD Olimpija Ljubljana players
Pittsburgh Penguins draft picks
Rockford IceHogs (UHL) players
San Diego Gulls (WCHL) players
San Jose Rhinos players
HC Sierre players
Sportspeople from St. Cloud, Minnesota
HC Thurgau players
EC VSV players
EK Zell am See players
Ice hockey coaches from Minnesota
American expatriate ice hockey players in Austria
American expatriate ice hockey players in Switzerland
American expatriate ice hockey players in Slovenia
American expatriate ice hockey players in Germany
American expatriate ice hockey players in Italy
American expatriate ice hockey players in Denmark